Red Butterfly is a postmodern romantic tragedy written & directed by Jon Alston and starring Diogo Morgado, Christine Evangelista, Wilson Jermaine Heredia, Laurence Mason, and Byrdie Bell. Red Butterfly is an original screenplay written by Jon Alston. It is an independently produced feature with subject matter not typical of independent feature film. Alston claims the film's primary audience to be "regular folk who like heavy entertainment." The story is inspired by the works of both Carl Jung and Joseph Campbell; it explores the consequences of the unchecked human ego. "Vice is Tragedy" is a theme that Alston claims to have had significance to him upon personal reflection of his time in the NFL. The film premiered at the St. Louis International Film Festival and is slated to for domestic and international release in the fall of 2015.

Cast
 Diogo Morgado as Tonio Vega Jr.
 Christine Evangelista as Cleo (Simo) McKenna
 Wilson Jermaine Heredia as TC (Simo)
 Laurence Mason as "Dutch"
 Byrdie Bell as Carrie
 James A Stephens as Vinnie the Killer
 Jen Araki as Helena

Production
Red Butterfly was produced in New York City, based on an original screenplay written by Jon Alston.

References

External links
http://www.redbutterflymovie.com

2015 films